Karl Frankenstein (16 February 1905 – 22 January 1990) was an Israeli professor in special education and pedagogy.

Biography
Frankenstein was born in 1905 in Berlin, Germany. In 1927, he completed his studies in philosophy and psychology at Berlin University and the University of Erlangen. During his studies, he was actively involved in Jewish relief organizations. After a period in France, he immigrated to Mandate Palestine in 1935.

Pedagogic and academic career
From 1935 until 1965, Frankenstein was a lecturer and faculty member at a number of educational establishments, including the School of Social Service of the Jewish National Council, nursing schools, teaching seminars, Youth Aliyah organizations and the Department of Criminology at the Hebrew University of Jerusalem. In 1937, he was appointed as the first juvenile probation officer in the country. He was also served as liaison between the National Committee and the Mandate authorities in the field of for welfare and education and was also active behalf of the National Council with respect to the social and educational welfare of children from Mizrahi families.

In 1948, after the establishment of the State of Israel, he was appointed head of the Henrietta Szold Institute, (National Institute for Research in the Behavioral Sciences) in Jerusalem. He held this position until 1953.

From 1951 until his retirement in 1969, Frankenstein was a faculty member at the Hebrew University, and served as a professor for pedagogy and special education. His principal areas of study were developmental sociology, juvenile delinquency, rehabilitation intelligence, problems in immigrant absorption, ways of thinking, psychology and psychopathy.

After retiring from the university, he served as editor of the journal "Magamot" (Trends).

Awards and recognition
 In 1965, Frankenstein was awarded the Israel Prize, in education.

Published works
Frankenstein's thoughts and research were published in many books, primarily in Hebrew, but including eight in English and four German.

See also
List of Israel Prize recipients

References

1905 births
1990 deaths
Jewish emigrants from Nazi Germany to Mandatory Palestine
Israeli educators
People from Berlin
Humboldt University of Berlin alumni
University of Erlangen-Nuremberg alumni
Academic staff of the Hebrew University of Jerusalem
Israel Prize in education recipients